Ælfthryth of Wessex (c. 877 – 7 June 929), also known as Elftrudis (Elftrude, Elfrida), was an English princess and a countess consort of Flanders to Baldwin II.

Life 
She was the youngest daughter of Alfred the Great, the Saxon King of England and his wife Ealhswith. Her siblings included King Edward the Elder and Æthelflæd.

Between 893 and 899, Ælfthryth married Baldwin II (died 918), Count of Flanders.

They had the following issue:

Arnulf I of Flanders (d. 964/65); married Adela of Vermandois
Adalulf, Count of Boulogne (d. 933)
Ealswid 
Ermentrud

References

Sources

External links
 

.

870s births
929 deaths
Year of birth uncertain
9th-century English people
10th-century English people
9th-century English women
10th-century English women
Countesses of Flanders 
Anglo-Saxon royalty
Place of birth unknown
Place of death unknown
House of Wessex
English princesses
Daughters of kings